Linus the Lionhearted is an American Saturday morning animated television series that aired on CBS from September 26, 1964 to December 11, 1965, originally airing in black and white. Colorized versions of the episodes started airing on ABC in 1966, and continued reruns until September 7, 1969. It was an early Saturday morning cartoon. The show follows a jungle-dwelling lion king who ruled from his personal barber's chair.

The character was created in 1959, by the Ed Graham advertising agency, originally as a series of ads for General Foods' Post Cereals. At first, Linus the lion was the spokesman for the short-lived Post cereal "Heart of Oats" (a Cheerios imitation). Eventually, the lion was redesigned and reintroduced in 1963, to sell Crispy Critters, which featured Linus on the box. The ads were so popular that a television series was created in 1964, with General Foods as sponsor. The show ran on the CBS network until 1966, and reruns aired on ABC from 1966 to 1969.

History

In addition to Linus, a rather good-natured "King of the Beasts" who ruled from his personal barber's chair and was voiced by Sheldon Leonard, there were other features as well, all based on characters representing other Post breakfast cereals. The best-known of these was Sugar Bear (Sugar Crisp), who sounded like Dean Martin and was voiced by actor Gerry Matthews. There was also a postman named Lovable Truly (Alpha-Bits), a young Asian boy named So-Hi (Rice Krinkles), and Rory Raccoon (Post Toasties).

A long-play record album was released as a premium tie-in in the year of the show's debut, featuring the characters (voiced by the same stars as the animated cartoon) singing familiar songs such as "Jimmy Cracked Corn" with rewritten lyrics. A coloring book was also published which detailed the adventures of So-Hi going on a scavenger hunt in order to break a curse on a two-headed bird, who is then transformed into a human boy due to So-Hi's dedication.

Vocal talent
The show was perhaps best noted for its abundance of well-known vocal talent. In addition to Leonard, Carl Reiner voiced several characters, most notably Linus' friend Billy Bird; Ruth Buzzi voiced an old witch who'd befriended Lovable Truly, as well as Sugar Bear's sometime nemesis, Granny Goodwitch; and veteran Bob McFadden voiced So Hi, Rory and Lovable Truly. Jonathan Winters made a number of guest appearances, as did Jerry Stiller and his wife Anne Meara. Also credited was the later "Maytag Repairman," Jesse White.

End theme
As opposed to the cartoon's jaunty, upbeat, fast-paced opening, which promoted "Linus the King, Linus the Star, Linus the Lionhearted," the end theme, likely by the Johnny Mann Singers, was slow and melancholy in tone. As it played, the cartoon's five principal characters—Linus, Lovable Truly, Rory Raccoon, So Hi, and Sugar Bear were depicted loading the series' "props" into a trunk under a spotlight. As the song progressed and with the trunk filled, closed, and now in Linus' hand, the characters, with big tears in their eyes, were all sadly forced to wave goodbye, turned, and faded away into darkness as they walked out of the spotlight. As the song concluded, Billy Bird "mopped up" the white spotlight circle of tears until it faded to black for the week:

"Linus and his friends must go, so we leave you with a song.

We're all kind of sad to go, glad to know it won't be long.

Lion-hearted friendships don't end, we'll all be back, and then

Linus and his friends will go on with the show again!"

Cancellation
The FCC made a ruling in 1969 that forbade children's show characters from appearing in advertisements on the same program and ABC was forced to cancel reruns.

Episode list

Segments
 C = The Company (i.e., wraparound segment)- 39 segments
 LK = Linus, King of Beasts- 39 segments
 LT = Lovable Truly- 35 segments
 R = Rory Raccoon, Hometown Hero- 19 segments
 SH = So-Hi- 37 segments
 SB = Sugar Bear- 22 segments

Season 1 (1964–65)

Season 2 (1965)

Credits

Season 1
Supervising Director: Irv Spector
Production Supervision: Lew Irwin
Character Models: George Cannata
Head Writer: Bill Schnurr
Associate Producer: Rick Herland
Produced and Directed by Ed Graham, Jr.
Animation Directors: John Freeman, Clyde Geronimi, Rube Grossman, Ed Rehberg, George Singer, Marvin Woodward, T. Hee
Layouts: Corny Cole, Bob Dranko, Burt Freund, Dave Hanan, Homer Jonas, Tony Rivera, Sam Weiss, Osmond Evans, Bob Singer, Gerard Baldwin, Fred Crippen, Mordicai Gerstein, Alex Ignatiev, Victor Haboush, Elmer Plummer, Ray Jacobs, Ron Maidenberg, Marty Murphy
Storyboards: Tom Dagenais, Art Diamond, Bob Givens, Cal Howard, Bob Kurtz, Mike Smollin, Dave Detiege, Jim Mueller, Ken Mundie, Jack Miller
Backgrounds: Bill Butler, Boris Gorelick, Erv Kaplan, Bob McIntosh, Lorraine Morgan, Curt Perkins
Editors: Hank Goetzenberg, Jerry MacDonald, George Mahana
Sound Engineer: Gil Arion
Ink and Paint by Connie Crawley, Dea Shirley
Character Layouts: Stan Green
Special Music Arrangements: Johnny Mann
Production Assistants: Ruth Kennedy, Armand Shaw
Animators: Ray Abrams, Frank Andrina, Gerard Baldwin, Tom Baron, Warren Batchelder, Bob Bentley, Dan Bessie, Frank Braxton, Brad Case, Fred Crippen, Jim Davis, Ed Friedman, Bob Goe, Frank Gonzales, Manny Gould, Bill Hajee, Ken Hultgren, Tom McDonald, Dan Mills, Chic Otterstrom, Amby Paliwoda, Manuel Perez, Virgil Ross, Frank Smith, Ed Solomon, Russ von Neida, Ray Young, Rudy Zamora

Season 2
Direction: Gerard Baldwin, Clyde Geronimi, George Singer, Marvin Woodward
Music: Hoyt Curtin
Head Writer: Bill Schnurr
Character Models: George Cannata Jr.
Production Supervision: Lew Irwin
Production Assistants: Henry Hof III, Ruth Kennedy, Armand Shaw
Film Editing: Hank Gotzenberg, George Mahana
Sound Engineer: Gil Arion
Inking & Painting: Connie Crawley
Storyboards: Tom Dagenais, Tom Henderson, Lee Mishkin, Irv Spector
Layout: Stan Green, Burt Freund, Don Jurwich, Tony Rivera, Sam Weiss
Animation: Bob Bentley, Ted Bonnicksen, Herm Cohen, Ed Friedman, Bob Goe, Manny Gould, Bill Hajik, Ken Hultgren, Fred Madison, Amby Paliwoda, George Rowley, Ed Solomon, John Walker, Rudy Zamora
Background: Erv Kaplan, Curt Perkins
Associate Producer: Rick Herland
Produced and Directed by Ed Graham Jr.

Voices
Carl Reiner - Billy Bird, Dinny Kangaroo and various other characters
Sheldon Leonard - Linus the Lionhearted
Bob McFadden - So Hi, Rory Raccoon, and Lovable Truly
Gerry Matthews - Sugar Bear
Jesse White - Claudius Crow
Ruth Buzzi - Granny Goodwitch
Paul Frees - various supporting characters
"Bashful Bigshots" (various big name guest stars, usually not credited)
Jonathan Winters
Tom Poston
Stiller & Meara

References

External links 
 

1964 American television series debuts
1969 American television series endings
1960s American animated television series
American Broadcasting Company original programming
American children's animated comedy television series
CBS original programming
Post Foods characters
Male characters in animation
Male characters in advertising
Black-and-white American television shows
English-language television shows
Animated television series about lions
Television series by CBS Studios